31 may refer to: 

 31 (number)

Years 
 31 BC
 AD 31
 1931 CE ('31)
 2031 CE ('31)

Music
 Thirty One (Jana Kramer album), 2015
 Thirty One (Jarryd James album), 2015
 "Thirty One", a song by Karma to Burn from the album Wild, Wonderful Purgatory, 1999

Film and television
 31 (film), a 2016 horror film
 31 (Kazakhstan), a television channel
 31 Digital, an Australian video on demand service

Transportation
 31st (CTA station), a rapid transit station in Chicago
 31 (MBTA bus), a bus route in Boston, Massachusetts
 31 (RIPTA), a bus route in Rhode Island

Other uses 
 Thirty-one (card game)

See also

 
 
 
 
 Channel 31 (disambiguation)
 Section 31 (disambiguation)
 List of highways numbered 31